Dihlabeng Local Municipality is an administrative area in the Thabo Mofutsanyane District of the Free State in South Africa. It was established in terms of Section 12 of the Local Government Structures Act, 117 of 1998, after the first general local government elections of 5 December 2000 which heralded the final phase of local government reform as envisaged in 1994 at the onset of the process of democratisation.

The Municipality is a category B as defined in the Local Government Structures Act and shares executive and legislative authority with the category C municipality within whose area it falls i.e. Thabo Mofutsanyana District Municipality. The type is that of a Collective Executive System combined with a Ward Participatory System.

Geography 
The Dihlabeng Local Municipality is situated within the boundaries of the Thabo Mofutsanyana District Municipality in the Eastern Free State.  The geographical area is 7550.4910 km2. The Municipality consists of the towns Bethlehem (incl. Bohlokong & Bakenpark), Clarens (incl. Kgubetswana), Fouriesburg (incl. Mashaeng), Paul Roux (incl. Fateng-Tse-Ntsho) and Rosendal (incl. Mautse).

Bethlehem is situated approximately 240 km north-east of Bloemfontein, 140 km east of Kroonstad and 90 km west of Harrismith.  The town is strategically situated in the heart of the picturesque north-eastern Free State and originally developed as a service centre.  Growth is stimulated by the strategic location of the area that serves as a central regional centre, situated adjacent to the N5 between Bloemfontein and Durban.

The scenic town of Clarens, often referred to the “Switzerland” of South Africa is situated ± 34 km south-east of Bethlehem.  Clarens is a mere 20 km from the Golden Gate Highlands National Park.

Fouriesburg is situated on the R26 route and in close proximity of Lesotho.  The town has the predominant function of a small service centre and is increasingly being supported by the tourism industry.  67% of the population resides in urban areas and 33% in surrounding rural areas.

Paul Roux is situated 35 km west of Bethlehem, on the N%.  The area is mainly focused on agricultural significance.

Rosendal is located at the foot of the Witteberg mountain range on the R70.

Economy
The economic activities within the Municipality are dominated by farming (29.4%) and private business (17.2%). At ± 15% and 11% respectively, social services and trade operations are also relatively high economic activities.

Of a total farmland area of ± 3 000 ha in the Eastern Free State, 34% thereof is located within the Dihlabeng area – a factor that confirms the Agricultural comparative advantage that the sub region has in the Free State Province. The normal industrial incentives, with specific reference to affordable purchase prices, endorsed by Dihlabeng Local Council, ensure growth in the epithelium industrial area.  The significance of the Lesotho Highlands Water and the Bethlehem Hydro Electricity projects are also relevant in this regard.  Upmarket Residential, Business and Tourism development of a large scale is currently taking place in the region.

The agricultural sector of the Dihlabeng region is extremely prominent.

Considering small scale processing industries and intensive farming activities will result in future economic growth in the Agriculture sector. Effective productive grazing and small scale farming programmes on the existing and identified land for commonage have future growth potential. As part of Government’s Land Reform Programme, emerging farmers are trained and supported to ensure productive farming practices, which ensures economic growth in Dihlabeng..

Main places
The 2001 census divided the municipality into the following main places:

Politics 

The municipal council consists of forty members elected by mixed-member proportional representation. Twenty councillors are elected by first-past-the-post voting in twenty wards, while the remaining twenty are chosen from party lists so that the total number of party representatives is proportional to the number of votes received. In the election of 1 November 2021 the African National Congress (ANC) won a majority of twenty-three seats on the council.

The following table shows the results of the 2021 election.

References

External links
 Dihlabeng Local Municipality

Local municipalities of the Thabo Mofutsanyane District Municipality